

Bruno Frankewitz (8 December 1897  – 11 August 1982) was a German general during World War II who commanded the 215. Infanterie-Division. He was a recipient of the  Knight's Cross of the Iron Cross with Oak Leaves.

Awards and decorations
 Iron Cross (1914)  2nd Class (7 August 1915) & 1st Class (27 January 1918)

 Clasp to the Iron Cross (1939)  2nd Class (21 September 1939) & 1st Class (3 October 1939)
 German Cross in Gold on 1 April 1942 as Oberst in Artillerie-Regiment 161

 Knight's Cross of the Iron Cross with Oak Leaves
 Knight's Cross on 29 February 1944 as Generalleutnant and commander of 215. Infanterie-Division
 Oak Leaves on 16 March 1945 as Generalleutnant and commander of 215. Infanterie-Division

References

Citations

Bibliography

 
 
 

1897 births
1982 deaths
People from Sztum County
People from West Prussia
Lieutenant generals of the German Army (Wehrmacht)
German Army personnel of World War I
Prussian Army personnel
Recipients of the Gold German Cross
Recipients of the Knight's Cross of the Iron Cross with Oak Leaves
Recipients of the Order of the Cross of Liberty, 2nd Class
German prisoners of war in World War II held by the United States
Recipients of the clasp to the Iron Cross, 1st class
20th-century Freikorps personnel
German Army generals of World War II